Timothy James Phillips (born 13 March 1981) is an English cricketer who was educated at Felsted. He is a left-handed batsman and a slow left-arm bowler. He has played for Essex since the age of 18.

Phillips usually bats at around 7/8/9 for Essex and has been known to rescue his team from ominous situations with useful scores. His bowling is slow left arm orthodox. He struggled to make his name a permanent fixture on the Essex teamsheet between his debut in 1999 and 2010 due to the presence of Pakistani legspinner Danish Kaneria for six of those years. However, in the 2011 season, following Kaneria's departure, Phillips looks to have gained an Essex starting place in all forms of the game, a fact outlined by the fact that Essex chose not to sign another spinner to replace Kaneria. Tim Phillips is also a very capable fielder. He often fields at either third slip or gully, and very rarely drops catches.

Phillips famously bowled Kevin Pietersen, playing his first home game for Hampshire, for a five-ball duck.  More recently, Phillips has taken part in the Twenty20 Cup, turning in some sturdy bowling performances and employing clever technique, helping his team reach the semi-final stage for the first time.

Phillips claimed man of the match in the Twenty 20 quarter final with figures of 2-11, taking Essex through to finals day for the first time ever. In 2009 Phillips returned to the squad having undergone surgery on his knee, to take another Man of the Match award for his 5-38 and 41 runs in the Pro 40 clash with Somerset.

External links
 Phillips takes the plaudits
 Match Winner for Essex 2011
 Tim Phillips claims 4-22 bowling Essex to Victory. 2011
 low left-armer Tim Phillips recorded competition-best figures of 5-28 for Essex, who had little trouble knocking off the runs.
Tim Phillips at ECB
Tim Phillips at BBC Sport. Man of the Match 2009.
Tim Phillips at Guardian Sport. Man of the Match 2009
Tim Phillips at Mirror Sport. Phillips Gives Essex Win.
Tim Phillips at ECB. A fine all-round display from Tim Phillips led Essex to a thrilling two-wicket NatWest Pro40 victory over title contenders Somerset at Taunton
Tim Phillips at Player Provider, Cricket Player Agency. www.playerprovider.com

1981 births
Living people
English cricketers
Essex cricketers
NBC Denis Compton Award recipients
Alumni of Durham University
Durham MCCU cricketers